Kim Ha-Neul (born 17 December 1988), also known as Ha-Neul Kim, is a South Korean professional golfer.

Since 2015, Kim is playing full-time on the LPGA of Japan Tour having secured her card in the final qualifying tournament of the 2014 season.

In January 2022, Kim signed with YG KPlus after retiring from professional golf after 15 years.

Professional wins (15)

LPGA of Korea Tour wins (8)

Tournaments in bold denotes major tournaments in LPGA of Korea

LPGA of Japan Tour (6)

Other wins (1)
2013 Mission Hills World Ladies Championship – team (with Inbee Park)

Filmography

Television shows

Awards and nominations

References

External links

Profile on Seoul Sisters site

South Korean female golfers
LPGA of Korea Tour golfers
LPGA of Japan Tour golfers
Konkuk University alumni
1988 births
Living people